The Utrecht–Kampen railway (also known as Centraalspoorweg) is an important railway line in the Netherlands running from Utrecht to Kampen, passing through Bilthoven, Amersfoort, Nijkerk, Ermelo, Harderwijk, Nunspeet, Wezep and Zwolle. The line was opened between 1863 and 1865 by the Nederlandsche Centraal-Spoorweg-Maatschappij. Its northern part (Zwolle–Kampen) is known as the Kamperlijntje, currently operated by Keolis Nederland.

Stations
The main interchange stations on the Utrecht–Kampen railway are:

Utrecht Centraal railway station to Amsterdam, Rotterdam, Arnhem and Eindhoven
Amersfoort railway station to Apeldoorn, Enschede and Amsterdam
Zwolle railway station to Arnhem, Groningen, Leeuwarden, Emmen and Almelo

Gallery

Railway lines in the Netherlands
Railway lines opened in 1865
1865 establishments in the Netherlands
Railway lines in Utrecht (province)
Railway lines in Gelderland
Railway lines in Overijssel
Standard gauge railways in the Netherlands
Rail transport in Utrecht (city)
19th-century architecture in the Netherlands